Yohan is a male given name of many origins.

Notable people with the name include:

Yohan Benalouane (born 1987), Tunisian football player
Yohan Betsch (born 1987), French football player
Yohan Blake (born 1989), Jamaican athlete
Yohan Cabaye (born 1986), French football player
Yohan Goonasekera (born 1957), Sri Lankan Sinhala cricketer
Yohan Goutt Gonçalves (born 1994), Timorese skier 
Yohan Kende (born 1949), Israeli Olympic swimmer
Yohan Le Bourhis (born 2000), Canadian soccer player
Yohan Lidon (born 1983), French kickboxer
Yohan Montès (born 1985), French rugby player
Yohan Ramírez (born 1995), Dominican baseball player
Yohan de Silva (born 1985), Sri Lankan Sinhala cricketer
Yohan Tavares (born 1988), Portuguese football player

See also
Yo-han
Yohannes (disambiguation)
Johannes